The administrative division of Oman contains Eleven Governorates (muhafazah):
Ad Dakhiliyah
Ad Dhahirah
Al Batinah North
Al Batinah South
Al Buraimi
Al Wusta
Ash Sharqiyah North
Ash Sharqiyah South
Dhofar
Muscat
Musandam
Within the governorates, Oman is sub-divided into 61 provinces (wilayat).

Ad Dakhiliyah Governorate

Al Dhahirah Governorate

Al Batinah North Governorate

Al Batinah South Governorate

Al Buraimi Governorate

Al Wusta Governorate

Ash Sharqiyah North Governorate

Ash Sharqiyah South Governorate

Dhofar Governorate

Muscat Governorate

Musandam Governorate

See also

List of cities in Oman
Regions and governorates of Oman

References

External links

Ministry of Foreign Affairs of Oman

 
Subdivisions of Oman
Oman, Provinces
Oman 2
Provinces, Oman
Oman geography-related lists

cs:Administrativní dělení Ománu